Sunshine Gardens may refer to:

 A suburb of Orlando, Florida
 Former name of H.V. McKay Memorial Gardens in Sunshine, Victoria Australia 
 A neighborhood in Fredericton
 A residential subdivision in South San Francisco, California